Norman W. Ressler (May 27, 1873 – September 29, 1914) was a corporal serving in the United States Army during the Spanish–American War who received the Medal of Honor for bravery.

Biography
Ressler was born May 27, 1873, in Dalmatia, Pennsylvania and entered the army from St. Louis, Missouri in October 1895. He was sent to fight in the Spanish–American War with Company D, 17th U.S. Infantry as a corporal where he received the Medal of Honor for his actions. He was discharged in October 1900, and rejoined the army in January 1902.

Ressler died on September 29, 1914, and is buried in San Francisco National Cemetery San Francisco, California His grave can be found in section W.S, grave 134-A.

Medal of Honor citation
Rank and organization: Corporal, Company D, 17th U.S. Infantry. Place and date: At El Caney, Cuba, 1 July 1898. Entered service at: Dalmatia, Pa. Birth: Dalmatia, Pa. Date of issue: 21 August 1899.

Citation:

Gallantly assisted in the rescue of the wounded from in front of the lines and under heavy fire of the enemy.

See also

List of Medal of Honor recipients for the Spanish–American War

References

External links

1873 births
1914 deaths
United States Army Medal of Honor recipients
United States Army soldiers
American military personnel of the Spanish–American War
People from Northumberland County, Pennsylvania
Burials in California
Spanish–American War recipients of the Medal of Honor
Burials at San Francisco National Cemetery